Let's Get Together may refer to:

Books
 "Let's Get Together" (short story), a story by Isaac Asimov

Music

Albums
 Let's Get Together (Tammy Wynette album), 1977
 Let's Get Together (Dickey Betts Band album), 2001

Songs
 "Let's Get Together" (Hayley Mills song)
 "Get Together" (Youngbloods song), also known as "Let's Get Together"
 "Let's Get Together", a song by Alexander O'Neal
 "Let's Get Together", a song by Eddie Cochran from Legendary Masters Series
 "Let's Get Together", a song by Girl Authority from Road Trip
 "Let's Get Together", a song by KC and the Sunshine Band from KC Ten
 "Let's Get Together", a song by Newton Faulkner from the album Rebuilt by Humans

See also 
 "Let's Get Together Now", a song used as an anthem for the 2002 World Cup
 "Let's Stick Together" (song), recorded by Canned Heat, Bryan Ferry, and others
 Get Together (disambiguation)